Brandon is a surname. Notable persons with that surname include:
 Alexander Brandon (born 1974), American musician and composer
 Alfred de Bathe Brandon (all of Wellington, New Zealand):
 Alfred Brandon (politician) (1809–86), politician
 Alfred Brandon (mayor) (1854–1938), Mayor of Wellington, New Zealand (son of the above)
 Alfred Brandon (lawyer) (1883–1974), of Wellington, New Zealand (son of the above)
 Arthur Brandon (1822–1847), British architect and architectural writer, brother of Raphael B.
 Brent D. Brandon (born 1960), U.S. Air Force aviator, Distinguished Flying Cross
 Catherine Willoughby, 12th Baroness Willoughby de Eresby (Catherine Brandon) (1519–1580), duchess of Suffolk
 Charles Brandon, 1st Duke of Suffolk, close friend and brother-in-law of Henry VIII
 Charles Brandon, 3rd Duke of Suffolk (c. 1484 – 1545)
 Chris Brandon (born 1976), professional English football player
 Dave Brandon (born 1952), American businessman
 David Brandon (actor) (born 1940), American actor
 David Brandon (architect) (1813–1897), Scottish architect
 Edgar Ewing Brandon (1865–1957), professor of French and former president of Miami University
 Eleanor Clifford, Countess of Cumberland (Lady Eleanor Brandon) (1519–1547)
 Elmer Brandon (1906–1956), Canadian politician
 Eric Brandon (1920–1982), English Formula One driver
 Frances Grey, Duchess of Suffolk (1517–1559), maiden name Lady Frances Brandon, niece of Henry VIII
 Gennifer Brandon (born 1990), American basketball player
 Gerard Brandon (1788–1850), American politician and Governor of Mississippi
 Harry "Skip" Brandon (b. 1941), founding partner of Smith Brandon International
 Heather Brandon, South African chairman of the World Board of the World Association of Girl Guides and Girl Scouts
 Henry Brandon, 2nd Duke of Suffolk (1535–1551), son of Charles Brandon, 1st Duke of Suffolk and Catherine Willoughby
 Henry Brandon, 1st Earl of Lincoln (1516–1534), nephew of Henry VIII
 Henry Brandon (actor) (1912–1990), American character actor
 Henry L. Brandon (1923–1997), American naval aviator and businessman
 Henry Brandon, Baron Brandon of Oakbrook (1920–1999), Baron of Oakbrook
 Jacques Émile Édouard Brandon (1831–1897), French artist 
 Johnny Brandon (1925-2017), English singer
 Kirk Brandon (born 1956), British musician and singer/songwriter
 Mark E. Brandon, American lawyer and academic
 Martin Brandon-Bravo (1932-2018), British politician
 Michael Brandon (born 1945), American actor
 Michael Brandon (pornographic actor) (born 1965), American pornographic actor
 Raphael Brandon (1817–1877), British architect and architectural writer, brother of Arthur B.
 Richard Brandon (?? – 1649), English hangman
 S. G. F. Brandon (1907–1971), University of Manchester professor of comparative religion
 Sam Brandon (born 1979), American football player
 Skeeter Brandon (1948–2008), American blues keyboardist, singer and songwriter
 Terrell Brandon (born 1970), American former basketball player
 Thomas Brandon (cricketer), 18th century English cricketer
 Thomas Brandon (diplomat) (died 1510), English diplomat
 Tony Brandon (born 1933), British radio presenter and comedian
 Warren Eugene Brandon (1916–1977), American painter
 William Brandon (author) (1914–2002), American writer and historian
 William Brandon (standard-bearer) (1456–1485), standard-bearer at the Battle of Bosworth
 William W. Brandon (1868–1934), former governor of Alabama

See also
Brandan, given name and surname
Branden (surname)
Brandin, surname and given name